Georges Gardet (October 11, 1863 – 6 February 1939) was a French sculptor and animalier.

Biography
The son of a sculptor, Gardet attended the École des Beaux-Arts in the atelier of Aimé Millet and Emmanuel Fremiet (another noted animalier).  Gardet's wife Madeleine was the sister of painter and decorator Jean Francis Auburtin, who collaborated with Gardet on work for the Parisian Exposition Universelle (1900).

Gardet was made an Officer of the Legion of Honor in 1900, and was a member of the Académie des Beaux-Arts, and the Society of French Artists.

Work 

 bronze Drama of the Desert, Parc Montsouris, Paris, 1891
 two animal groups (tiger attacking buffalo, leopard catching a turtle) flanking the entrance to the Musée des Sciences of Laval, France, 1892
 lion groups at the Pont Alexandre III, Paris, circa 1900
 lions at the Jardin du Luxembourg, Paris
 six bronze crocodiles (or "sea monsters") surrounding the base of monument The Triumph of Republic by Jules Dalou, Place de la Nation, added in 1908, scrapped by the Germans in 1941
 Monument to the Lion of Judah, Addis Ababa, Ethiopia
 gilded finial figure Eternal Youth, along with two bison flanking the grand staircase inside, for the Manitoba Legislative Building, Winnipeg, 1918
 two groups of deer for the grounds of the Château de Sceaux in Sceaux, Hauts-de-Seine (outside Paris), 1933
 bronze lion on the grounds of St. Mark's School, Southborough, Massachusetts
 bronze bison, Harris Circle at east entrance to Pioneers Park, Lincoln, Nebraska installed April 14–15, 1930 and dedicated May 17, 1930

References

External links

 

1863 births
1939 deaths
Officiers of the Légion d'honneur
Members of the Académie des beaux-arts
Animal artists
19th-century French painters
French male painters
20th-century French painters
20th-century French male artists
20th-century French sculptors
19th-century French sculptors
French male sculptors
19th-century French male artists